Diluwa Khutugtu Jamsrangjab (1883 – 7 April 1965) was a Mongolian Khutugtu and Tibetan Buddhist tulku, politician and Mongolian-American scholar. His autobiography was published in English.

When Jamsrangjab was born to commoners, Bashlu and Gimbeles, in Zagdsambar of Zasagt Khan (in modern Zavkhan Province), there spread mysterious but amazing tales about his birth. At his age of 5, Bogd Khan declared Jamsrangjab to be the after-life of the late Diluwa. Jamsrangjab with his parents moved to the capital city Niislel Khuree. He studied the philosophy of Buddhism so hard that he was awarded religious dignities at the age of 7 and 21.

In 1916 the Diluwa Khutugtu was sent to the south-eastern frontier of Bogd Khaanate Mongolia with the Mongolian general, Khatanbaatar Magsarjav to ease the conflict between the Mongols and the Republic of China.

Diluwa Khutugtu Jamsrangjab was arrested in 1930 due to the accusation that he was linked with the so-called anti-communist leader, Eregdendagva. He was freed later after he didn't accept the trial. On 26 February 1931, the Diluwa Khutugtu was fled to China. After he had gone, false rumours about him spread among people. At the time, he didn't know he would never come back to his homeland again.

After he came to the United States in 1949 with the assistance of Owen Lattimore and fellow professors, Jamsranjab worked at the Johns Hopkins University. There he joined American-British professor Owen Lattimore's the Mongolia Project. In New Jersey, he founded a Monastery with Kalmyk American lamas in 1950-1952. He was elected the chief lama of the Monastery there. When he was in the US, he still worked for the international recognition of Mongolian independence.

He influenced Chan Kai Shek to declare "Mongolia can be a member of the United Nations like other independent nations" in 1960. On 7 April 1965, the last Mongolian Khutugtu, Jamsrangjab, died at the age of 82 in New York City. In 1990, the supreme court of Mongolia proved his innocence and abolished all decrees that accused him of false political crimes.

External links
Lewis, Lionel Stanley (1993) The Cold War and academic governance: the Lattimore case at Johns Hopkins - page 50

References

1883 births
1964 deaths
Tulkus
Mongolian politicians
Mongolian emigrants to the United States
Johns Hopkins University people
People from Zavkhan Province